RTV Kozarska Dubica or РТВ КД is a local Bosnian public cable television channel based in Kozarska Dubica municipality. Program is mainly produced in Serbian.

Dub Radio is also part of public municipality services.

External links 
 Official website of RTV Kozarska Dubica
 Website  of CRA BiH

Television stations in Bosnia and Herzegovina